The Playboy Club was initially a chain of nightclubs and resorts owned and operated by Playboy Enterprises. The first Playboy Club opened in Chicago in 1960. Each club generally featured a Living Room, a Playmate Bar, a Dining Room, and a Club Room.  Members and their guests were served food and drinks by Playboy Bunnies, some of whom were featured in Playboy magazine. The clubs offered name entertainers and comedians in the Club Rooms, and local musicians and the occasional close-up magician in the Living Rooms. Starting with the London and Jamaica club locations, the Playboy Club became international in scope.

In 1991, the club chain became defunct. Thereafter, on October 6, 2006, a Playboy Club was opened in Las Vegas at the Palms Casino Resort, and in 2010 clubs were opened as well in Macau and Cancun. In time, the Las Vegas club closed on June 4, 2012, the Macao club closed in 2013, and the Cancun club closed in 2014. In May 2014 the Commerce Casino in Los Angeles opened a Playboy-themed lounge consisting of gaming tables and Playboy Bunny cocktail waitresses. In September 2018 a Playboy Club was opened in Midtown Manhattan but permanently closed in November 2019 after just over one year in operation.

History 
The first club opened at 116 E. Walton Street in downtown Chicago, Illinois, United States, on February 29, 1960. It relocated to Clark and Armitage in Lincoln Park in 1980 and closed in June 1986.
Eventually many clubs were established across the United States:

There was also a Playboy Club in Montreal Canada. Playboy Clubs operated in Japan, under a franchise arrangement, in Tokyo, Osaka, Nagoya, and Sapporo. There were Playboy Club resorts in Ocho Rios, Jamaica, Great Gorge at McAfee, New Jersey, and at Lake Geneva, Wisconsin, as well as Club-Hotels such as the Playboy Plaza in Miami Beach, Florida and Playboy Towers in Chicago. The last American location before Playboy Club Las Vegas opened was Lansing, Michigan, located in the Hilton Hotel, which closed in July 1988.

International Clubs existed until the 1991 closing of the Manila, Philippines Club located in the Silahis International Hotel. In 2010 International Clubs were opened in Macao and Cancun but in time the Macao Club closed in 2013 and the Cancun Club closed in 2014. Manila was the only Club ever to be featured in Architectural Digest.

During the last three months of 1961, more than 132,000 people visited the Chicago club, making it the busiest night club in the world. Playboy Club membership became a status symbol. Only 21% of all key holders ever went to a club. At $25.00 per year per membership, Playboy grossed $25 million for every 1,000,000 members.

The Rabbit-headed metal Playboy key (supplanted by a metal key-card in 1966) was required for admission to a club. They were presented to the Door Bunny.

In 1965, Hugh Hefner sent Victor Lownes to London to open Playboy's British casinos, following legalization of gambling in the United Kingdom. In 1981, the casino at 45 Park Lane (now a luxury hotel, 45 Park Lane) was the most profitable casino in the world, and the British casinos contributed $32 million to the corporation. Later, Playboy also operated British casinos in Manchester and Portsmouth. In 1981, Playboy opened a hotel and casino in Atlantic City, New Jersey. However, the New Jersey gaming regulators denied Playboy a permanent gaming license, and Playboy sold its interest in the unit to Elsinore Corporation, its partner in the venture, in 1984, at which time the hotel and casino were renamed The Atlantis.

The Playboy Club in Lake Geneva, Wisconsin featured architecture inspired by Frank Lloyd Wright, operated from May 6, 1968, until 1981, had a ski slope, and was one of the first to install a chair lift. The facility is now operated as the Grand Geneva Resort & Spa. The 32-piece house orchestra was headed by Chicago pianist, Sam Distefano, who conducted for performers such as Peggy Lee, Mel Tormé, Liza Minnelli, Sonny & Cher, Dean Martin, Sammy Davis Jr., Paul Anka, Dionne Warwick, Wayne Newton,  Vic Damone, Diahann Carroll, Bette Midler, Anthony Newley, Vikki Carr, Tony Bennett, Natalie Cole, Donna Summer and Ann-Margret. Distefano went on to serve as Playboy's Vice President of entertainment for all Playboy Clubs and Hotels worldwide until he left Playboy after 25 years.

On October 6, 2006, Playboy opened a new Playboy Club in Las Vegas, Nevada. The new club at The Palms, with its prominent neon bunny head, had casinos, bars, and a restroom with pictures of Playmates on the walls. The club closed in June 2012.

Australian women were invited to Sydney to audition for the iconic Playboy Bunny role and for positions as singers and dancers at the Playboy Club. A minimum of five women were chosen to travel to Macao for a six-month contract as a Playboy Bunny. The Macao Playboy Club opened on November 24, 2010.

In October 2010, it was announced that a new Playboy Club in London was to be opened on the site of the old Rendezvous Mayfair Casino 14 Old Park Lane. It was opened on June 4, 2011. The 17,000 sq ft property, spread over two floors, was designed by London-based architects Jestico + Whiles. The club features a casino, cigar terrace, gentleman's tonic, sports bar ("The Player's Lounge"), night club ("The Tale Bar"), cocktail bar under the direction of Salvatore Calabrase, and a fine dining restaurant under the reins of Iron Chef Judy Joo. Along the stair-walls, a row of lenticular portraits are hung winking and smiling at guests as they walk by.

In November 2012, spokesman Sanjay Gupta announced that PB Lifestyle, the company in India with rights to the brand, would be opening its first club in India at Candolim, Goa in December 2012. It was planned as a  beach location. In April 2013, Goa Chief Minister Manohar Parrikar refused the application on "technical grounds". Parrikar said only individuals, not corporations, were eligible to operate a beach shack style club. The law did not preclude opening a night club. After the Goa club, PB Lifestyle planned to open clubs in Hyderabad and Mumbai. India's obscenity laws ban material deemed "lascivious or appealing to prurient interests". Adult magazines such as Playboy are banned in India. Designer Mohini Tadikonda has altered the original Playboy Bunnies uniform to satisfy India's obscenity laws. In 2nd half of 20th century, Spain, a local Hostess Bar businessman in the Valencia community registered the name: 'Club Playboy' and the rabbit icon. Several of this kind exist under the name.

On September 12, 2018, a Playboy Club was opened in New York City at 512 West 42nd Street in Midtown Manhattan. Many questioned the wisdom of opening a Playboy Club in the #MeToo era. On November 14, 2019, after just over one year in operation, the owners of the new Playboy Club in New York City announced the club had closed and the space would be re-branded as a steak house and other entertainment venue.

In popular culture 
 In the James Bond film Diamonds Are Forever (1971), Bond replaces his wallet with that of the recently killed diamond smuggler Peter Franks to confuse his contact, Tiffany Case. When she opens the wallet she finds Bond's Playboy Club Member Card, which she uses to identify the man on the floor.
 A 1976  episode of the TV show Charlies Angels  entitled  Lady Killer  sends the angels to work undercover at the Feline Club, an obvious spoof of then still open Playboy Clubs. 
 In a 1982 episode of the TV show Laverne & Shirley entitled "The Playboy Show", guest-starring Carrie Fisher, Laverne takes a job as a Playboy Bunny at The Playboy Club despite her father's wishes.
 The 1985 TV movie A Bunny's Tale, starring Kirstie Alley, was based on writer and future feminist leader Gloria Steinem's 1963 article for Huntington Hartford's Show magazine, a critical account of her time working as a Playboy Bunny at the New York Playboy Club.
 The TV movie Hefner: Unauthorized (1999) includes leotard-wearing women being trained as hostesses in a Playboy Club.
 The 2000 TV movie, A Tale of Two Bunnies (aka Price of Beauty) starring Marina Black and Julie Condra, tells the story of two girls working as Playboy Bunnies in 1961.
 In season one, episode two of the TV show Swingtown, first aired in 2008, the characters visit the Playboy Club.
 In a 2010 episode of the TV show Mad Men (season 4, episode 10 "Hands and Knees"), Lane Pryce (who is a member) takes his father and Don Draper to dinner at the Playboy Club in New York City and introduces them to his "chocolate bunny" girlfriend, Toni.
 September 2011 saw the premiere of NBC's The Playboy Club, a television series focusing on the employees and patrons of the first Playboy Club, located in Chicago. The series was cancelled after airing three episodes.

References

External links 
 The Playboy Club Bunny Manual (July 1969)
 The Playboy Club London Review

Playboy
Nightclubs in the United States
American companies established in 1960
Entertainment companies established in 1960
Entertainment companies disestablished in 1991
1960 establishments in Illinois
1991 disestablishments in Illinois